St. Peter und Paul  is a Catholic church and parish in the borough of Schierstein, Wiesbaden, Hesse,  Germany.

History 
The Catholic church in Schierstein, part of Wiesbaden, was designet by Johannes Traut, completed in 1967 and consecrated in 1968, dedicated to the apostles Peter and Paul. The parish is part of the Diocese of Limburg.

Building 
The church is built on a parabolic floorplan, with a separate bell tower. It features a pentaptychon by Helga Hein-Guardian, and a pipe organ built by Klais in 1970, with 27 stops on two manuals and pedal.

A garden behind the church, Bibelgarten, features plants mentioned in the Bible, with explanations.

Parish 

References

External links 

Churches completed in 1967
20th-century Roman Catholic church buildings in Germany
Roman Catholic churches in Hesse